Wolfgang Späte (8 September 1911 – 30 April 1997) was a German Luftwaffe fighter pilot during World War II. He was a recipient of the Knight's Cross of the Iron Cross with Oak Leaves. For fighter pilots it was a quantifiable measure of skill and combat success. He is attributed by some, for an early, 1938 version of the speed to fly theory, usually attributed to Paul MacCready. Already a talented glider pilot before the war, he went on to become one of the Luftwaffe's foremost test pilots.

Early life and career
Späte was born on 8 September 1911 in Dresden, at the time in the Kingdom of Saxony of the German Empire.

World War II
World War II in Europe began on Friday 1 September 1939 when German forces invaded Poland. During this invasion, Späte served with 2. Staffel (2nd squadron) of Heeres-Ergänzungs-Aufklärungsgruppe  23 (23rd army reconnaissance group), flying aerial reconnaissance missions, and received the Iron Cross 2nd Class on 8 November. Trained as a fighter pilot, he was posted to 5. Staffel of Jagdgeschwader 54 (JG 54—54th Fighter Wing) on 1 January 1941. The Staffel was headed by Oberleutnant Hubert Mütherich and subordinated to II. Gruppe (2nd group) of JG 54 commanded by Hauptmann Dietrich Hrabak. At the time, the Gruppe was based at Bonn-Hangelar Airfield at Sankt Augustin for a period of rest and replenishment following the losses sustained during the Battle of Britain.

On 29 March 1941, II. Gruppe of JG 54 was withdrawn from the English Channel and was ordered to Graz-Thalerhof. There the various squadrons were split up with 4. Staffel being subordinated to III. Gruppe of Jagdgeschwader 77 (JG 77—77th Fighter Wing) and ordered to Deta in Romania. On 6 April, 4. Staffel flew combat missions in the Invasion of Yugoslavia. The next day, the Staffel flew combat air patrols on the Hungarian-Yugoslavian border. On 9 April, II./JG 54 was united again at Kecskemét, Hungary and returned to Deta on 11 April. The Gruppe was withdrawn from this theater on 19 April and ordered to an airfield at Zemun near Belgrade. In this theater of operations, Späte claimed his first aerial victory, a Yugoslav Bristol Blenheim bomber near Pécs in Hungary, on 7 April 1941.

War against the Soviet Union
Following the surrender of the Royal Yugoslav Army on 17 April 1941, JG 54 received orders on 3 May 1941 to turn over all Bf 109-Es so they could receive the new Bf 109-F variant. Transition training was completed at Airfield Stolp-Reitz in Pomerania. Following intensive training, the Geschwader was moved to airfields in Eastern Prussia. II. Gruppe under command of Hauptmann Hrabak was moved to Trakehnen on 20 June 1941. The Wehrmacht launched Operation Barbarossa, the invasion of the Soviet Union, on 22 June with II. Gruppe supporting Army Group North in its strategic goal towards Leningrad.

Victories came regularly, and he was awarded the Honour Goblet of the Luftwaffe on 9 August. On 10 September, Späte was appointed Staffelkapitän (squadron leader) of 5. Staffel of JG 54. He succeeded Mütherich who was killed in action the day before. On 2 October, Späte claimed three aerial victories in combat near Lake Ilmen. His third claim of the day was JG 54s 1,000th aerial victory claimed since the launch of Operation Barbarossa on 22 June. Then on 5 October, he became the 10th member of JG 54 to be awarded the Knight's Cross of the Iron Cross, after reaching 45 victories.

His unit withdrew to the Reich at the end of the year for rest and refit, and Späte was promoted to Hauptmann on 1 January 1942. Success continued upon returning to the north of the Eastern Front as the Soviets desperately tried to raise the siege of Leningrad. This culminated with the award of the Knight's Cross of the Iron Cross with Oak Leaves on 23 April 1942 when he had 72 victories. The presentation was made by Adolf Hitler at the Wolf's Lair, Hitler's headquarters in Rastenburg, present-day Kętrzyn in Poland. Also presented with awards that day by Hitler were Hauptmann Herbert Ihlefeld, who received the Swords to his Knight's Cross with Oak Leaves, and Oberleutnant Wolf-Dietrich Huy who was also honored with the Oak Leaves. However, with the award, he was ordered back to the Reich to set up a top-secret unit: Erprobungskommando 16, (EKdo 16) to test-fly the revolutionary new rocket-fighter, the Messerschmitt Me 163 "Komet". In consequence, command of 5. Staffel of JG 54 was passed on to Hauptmann Joachim Wandel on 21 April.

Späte took his first flight in the Me 163 on 8 May 1942. Over the next year testing continued and slowly specially chosen pilots joined EKdo 16. Side by side with the rocket-fighter project, was the test program of the Me 262 jet-fighter (under EKdo 262). On 17 April 1943, Späte became the first Luftwaffe pilot to fly the Messerschmitt Me 262 (Werknummer 2620000002—factory number) jet fighter. He was one of a select few pilots to have flown both ground-breaking aircraft.

After another year, the Me 163 was deemed combat-ready, and the testing program was wound down. Before he left for his new posting though, on 14 May 1944 he flew the first combat sortie for the Me 163. According to some sources, his Me 163 PK+QL was painted red, either in the factory or by ground crew, resembling Manfred von Richthofen's Fokker Dr.I. Although he flew the mission (without success, twice unable to intercept the enemy when the rocket engine failed), Späte was not amused after seeing the plane and ordered it to be re-painted.

Group commander
In May 1944, Späte was appointed Gruppenkommandeur (group commander) of IV. Gruppe of JG 54. He replaced Hauptmann Gerhard Koall who had temporarily been leading the Gruppe after its former commander Hauptmann Siegfried Schnell was killed in action on 25 February 1944.

His new unit was quickly recalled to Germany in June to cover the transfer of all the squadrons sent west following the D-day landings. There it was converted onto the Fw 190A-8 and then sent to Poland against the great Russian summer offensive. But against vastly greater numbers of enemy aircraft the unit was butchered, losing nearly half its pilots killed or wounded - Späte himself was injured and forced two times to bail out of his aircraft. The unit was pulled back again to the Reich for refit and rebuild.
On 17 September, the Allied forces staged their airborne operation at Arnhem. Again, IV./JG 54 was thrown into the fray, but for the second time in less than 3 months, against vastly superior opposition, it was destroyed in less than a fortnight.

Whether due to problems getting the Me 163 operational, or his unit's catastrophic losses, Späte gave up his command of IV./JG 54. In his 4-month absence from the Me 163 programme, the first combat unit (I./JG 400) had been set up and he joined that unit to come back up to speed on the interceptor's progress (some sources say as the unit's commander, although Hptm Robert Olejnik is also given as the unit commander at this time).

Flying the Messerschmitt Me 262
After JG 400 was disbanded, Späte joined the Geschwaderstab (headquarters unit) of Jagdgeschwader 7 (JG 7—7th Fighter Wing) in April 1945. On 15 April, JG 7 was ordered to relocate to airfields at Saaz, present-day Žatec, Eger and the Prague–Ruzyně Airport where it continued to fly missions in defense of Berlin. On 17 April, JG 7 was able to get 20 Me 262 airborne which intercepted Boeing B-17 Flying Fortress bombers near Dresden. In this encounter, Späte claimed a B-17 bomber shot down.

In 1956 he rejoined the military service in the Bundeswehr. Späte retired in 1967. He died in 1997 in Edewecht, at the age of 85.

Summary of career

Aerial victory claims
According to Spick, Späte was credited with 99 aerial victories, claimed in over 600 combat missions, 90 of which on the Eastern Front and nine on the Western Front, including five four-engine bombers while flying the Me 262. Mathews and Foreman, authors of Luftwaffe Aces — Biographies and Victory Claims, researched the German Federal Archives and found records for 99 aerial victory claims, plus four further unconfirmed claims. This figure of confirmed claims includes 91 aerial victories on the Eastern Front and eight on the Western Front, including five four-engine bombers with the Me 262 jet fighter.

Awards
 Iron Cross (1939)
 2nd Class (8 November 1939)
 1st Class (27 June 1940)
 Honour Goblet of the Luftwaffe (9 August 1941)
 German Cross in Gold on 9 December 1941 as Oberleutnant in the II./Jagdgeschwader 54
 Knight's Cross of the Iron Cross with Oak Leaves
 Knight's Cross on 5 October 1941 as Oberleutnant of the Reserves and pilot in the 5./Jagdgeschwader 54
 90th Oak Leaves on 23 April 1942 as Oberleutnant of the Reserves and Staffelkapitän of the 5./Jagdgeschwader 54

Citations

References

Citations

Bibliography

 
 
 
 
 
 
 
 
 
 
 
 
 
 
 
 
 
 
 
 
 Späte, Wolfgang. Der streng geheime Vogel Me 163 (in German). DÖRFLER im NEBEL VERLAG GmbH. .
 
 
 
 
 
 Weal, John (2007). More Bf109 Aces of the Russian Front.

1911 births
1997 deaths
Military personnel from Dresden
Luftwaffe pilots
German test pilots
Glider pilots
German World War II flying aces
German Air Force personnel
Recipients of the Gold German Cross
Recipients of the Knight's Cross of the Iron Cross with Oak Leaves
People from the Kingdom of Saxony